Little Red River may refer to:

In the United States
Little Red River (Arkansas)
Little Red River (Texas)

In Canada
Little Red River Cree Nation, in Alberta
Little Red River 106C, an Indian reserve in Saskatchewan
Little Red River 106D, an Indian reserve in Saskatchewan
Little Red River (Saskatchewan), a river in central Saskatchewan